Viesturs Koziols (born 24 August 1963, in Riga, Soviet Union) is a Latvian real estate developer, media and sports entrepreneur, photographer, patron of arts, political and public figure.

Career 

After graduating from Faculty of Geography at the University of Latvia in 1986, Viesturs Koziols started off as a commercial manager of newspaper Atmoda. The paper had a strong connection with the ongoing Latvian independence movement; Viesturs Koziols actively joined it. He was among the organizers  of the large scale demonstration Baltic Way and joined the Popular Front of Latvia.

Viesturs Koziols was adviser to both the first and second Prime Ministers of Latvia, Ivars Godmanis and Valdis Birkavs, in the early 1990s. He was also adviser to the Minister of Economics Juris Lujāns.

During 1995–1997 he was project manager at Norwegian retail chain "Varner Baltija" and manager of real estate administration at "Varner Hakon Invest", both ventures of Varner-Gruppen. These companies were among first foreign investors in Latvia. Koziols was among politicians and business leaders who founded "Baltic Stability Foundation", an organization with a goal to develop investment strategies for Latvia and develop encouraging investment legislation.

Koziols primary business area (1996–present) is real estate development, retail development and city planning. Viesturs Koziols has participated in as an investor, developer and consultant in development of Rimi Baltic, Narvesen, Cubus, Bik Bok, Dressmann store chains; major shopping malls in Riga – Centrs, Mols, Dole, Alfa, Minsk, Origo, Olympia; hotels Radisson Blu Ridzene Hotel, Radisson Blu Hotel Latvija and Hotel Riga and large real estate developments – Saules akmens, Saliena.

From 2001 to 2004 Koziols was elected Chairman of the Council in joint stock company Latvijas Krājbanka – the bank with most branches in Latvia.

Viesturs Koziols is founder and patron of non-governmental youth organization "Avantis". Through this organization Koziols supported talented Latvian musicians, cinematographers and athletes. Producer and cameraman for "Avantis" released award winning documentary "Atrasts Amerikā" ("Found in USA").

In 2006 his company "Žurnāls" Ltd. began publishing a weekly magazine called "Republika.lv". Viesturs Koziols was among staff photographers. In 2007, together with photographer Ilmārs Znotiņš, he opened the photography studio "Imagine" – one of the most professional photo studios in the Baltic states and organized a major documentary photography event "One Day in Latvia 2007".

In 2008 Viesturs Koziols became Chairman of the Board of Kontinental Hockey League (KHL) ice hockey club Dinamo Riga.

In 2009 he became freelance adviser in fields of youth work to Ministry of the Interior affairs Linda Mūrniece.

Together with his business partner from Norway Tormod Stene-Johansen in 2012 established holding structure Latvian Development Fund (LDF).

October 2016 he was elected in Board of Latvian Hockey Federation and appointed as the Vice-President and General Secretary of the Latvian Ice hockey federation.
September 2021 Viesturs Koziols during IIHF ( International Ice Hockey Federation )semi-annual congress was elected as a Council member. 
Council appointed Mr. Koziols as a Chairman of IIHF Facilities Committee. 
December 2021 left position of General Secretary of Latvian Hockey Federation.

Adventurer 

In 1999, together with Vilis Dambiņš and Gunārs Dukšte, Viesturs Koziols reached the North Pole in a hot air balloon. Together with his daughter Liva Koziola he climbed Mount Kilimanjaro in 2000.

In 2013 have climbed Himalayas mountains in Bhutan.

References 

1963 births
Living people
Businesspeople from Riga
University of Latvia alumni